Dehimandau is a Ward in Dashrath Chand Municipality in the Baitadi District of Sudurpashchim Province of western Nepal. At the time of the 2021 Nepal census it had a population of 4,362 and has an area of 12.85 Sq.Km. The current elected chairman of Ward No.2 of Dashrath Chand Municipality is Surya Bahadur Bohara.

References

Populated places in Baitadi District